Burrell Memorial Observatory referred to as Burrell Observatory is an astronomical observatory located on the campus of Baldwin Wallace University. The observatory was established in 1940, in Berea, Ohio.

History
The observatory is located on the northernmost point of the Baldwin Wallace University campus. Built in 1940, the observatory is named after Katherine Ward Burrell as a memorial to her late husband Edward P. Burrell. The observatory houses a Warner & Swasey refracting telescope with a 13-inch objective, a 4-inch finder, and a 1-inch finder.

See also 
List of astronomical observatories

Notes

References
 Sifakis, C. The Mafia Encyclopedia: From Accardo to Zwillman. Facts on File, Incorporated 1999. .

Infrastructure completed in 1940
Astronomical observatories in Ohio
Tourist attractions in Cuyahoga County, Ohio
Buildings at Baldwin Wallace University